The 2022 Pernambuco state elections took place in the state of Pernambuco, Brazil on 2 October 2022. Voters elected a governor, vice governor, one senator, 25 representatives for the Chamber of Deputies, and 49 Legislative Assembly members. Paulo Câmara, the incumbent governor of Pernambuco, was reelected in the first round in 2018 Pernambuco gubernatorial election, with 1,918,219 votes, the equivalent to 50.70% of the valid votes. He wasn't eligible for a new term, since he ran for governor in 2014 and 2018. In a crowded field, former mayor of Caruaru Raquel Lyra (PSDB) defeated Federal Deputy Marília Arraes (Solidarity) by close to 20 points in the second round. She was inaugurated on 1 January 2023.

For the election to the Federal Senate, the seat occupied since 2014 by Fernando Bezerra Coelho, who was elected by the Brazilian Socialist Party (PSB), and currently affiliated to the Brazilian Democratic Movement (MDB), was at dispute. Teresa Leitão (PT), a state deputy, defeated former Minister of Tourism Gilson Machado (PL) by 15 points.

Electoral calendar

Gubernatorial candidates
Political parties have until August 15, 2022 to formally register their candidates.

Candidates

Withdrawn candidacies 

 Humberto Costa (PT) - Senator for Pernambuco (2011–present). He withdrew the candidacy by orders of the party itself. The Workers' Party will support the candidacy of Danilo Cabral (PSB).
 Armando Filho (PRTB) - He was announced as a candidate for the government by the Brazilian Labour Renewal Party but he gave up and decided to support the candidacy of Raquel Lyra. He was expelled from the party after this decision.

Senatorial candidates 
Political parties have until August 15, 2022 to formally register their candidates.

Potential candidates

Withdrawn candidates 

 Carlos Veras (PT) - Federal Deputy from Pernambuco (2019–present). Veras withdrew his candidacy to help the Workers' Party (PT) in the composition of the senatorial ticket, in order to build a consensus around the party's nomination. The federal deputy stated that this would help his ally Teresa Leitão on the gender issue on the ticket and that she has all the qualifications to be a senator.

Legislative Assembly 
The result of the last state election and the current situation in the Legislative Assembly of Pernambuco is given below:

Opinion polls

Governor

First round 
The first round is scheduled to take place on 2 October 2022.

Second round 
The second round (if necessary) is scheduled to take place on 30 October 2022.

Lyra vs. Arraes

Lyra vs. Cabral

Lyra vs. Anderson

Lyra vs. Coelho

Cabral vs. Anderson

Cabral vs. Coelho

Arraes vs. Cabral

Arraes vs. Anderson

Arraes vs. Coelho

Senator

Results

Governor

Senator

Notes

References

2022 Brazilian gubernatorial elections
2022 elections in Brazil